Anta Punco (possibly from Quechua anta copper, p'unqu pond, reservoir, tank; dam, "copper pond") is mountain in the northern extensions of the Vilcanota mountain range in the Andes of Peru, about  high. It is located in the Cusco Region, Quispicanchi Province,  Ocongate District. Anta Punco lies west of Jarjapata and southeast of Jolljepunco where the annual Quyllur Rit'i festival takes place.

References 

Mountains of Cusco Region
Mountains of Peru